Embryoglossa submarginata is a species of snout moth in the genus Embryoglossa. It was described by George Hamilton Kenrick in 1917 and is known from Madagascar.

References

Moths described in 1917
Pyralinae
Moths of Madagascar
Moths of Africa